Josia aurifusa is a moth of the  family Notodontidae. It is endemic to Venezuela.

Larvae have been recorded on Passiflora rubra and Passiflora capsularis.

External links
Species page at Tree of Life project

Notodontidae of South America
Moths described in 1854